Gređani may refer to the following places in Croatia:

Gređani, Brod-Posavina County, a village in the municipality of Stara Gradiška
Gređani, Sisak-Moslavina County, a village in the municipality of Topusko